Rehema Nanfuka (born 25 May 1986) is a Ugandan film, theatre and television actress, director, and filmmaker known for her roles in  Imani, Veronica's Wish, Imbabazi, The Girl in the Yellow Jumper, Queen of Katwe, Imperial Blue among other films.

She won the Best Director award at the 2018 Uganda Film Festival Awards, becoming the first female director to ever win an award in this category at any of the awarding bodies in Uganda.

Career

Film and Television
Rehema started her acting career in Mira Nair's Maisha Film Lab's 2008 production, Downcast where she played a housewife.

Her breakout role as Mary the maid in Imani won her two awards; the Africa Movie Academy Award for Most Promising Actress in 2010 sharing the win with Chelsea Eze and Best Actress Award at the African Film Festival of Cordoba, Spain in 2010. The film also won an Africa Movie Academy Award for Best Film in an African Language. Rehema also received recognition from the Variety critic Boyd Van Hoeij who wrote, "Rehema Nanfuka, as a distressed maid in the second-best segment, impresses with her quiet sense of dignity." and The Hollywood Reporter critic Neil Young wrote, "Nanfuka and Buyi are engaging performers and cope well with underwritten characters."

In 2013 she starred in Joel Karekezi's Imbabazi, The Pardon, a film about the Rwanda genocide in which she was nominated for the Best Actress award at the Festival du Cinéma Africain de Khouribga, Morocco 2015.

Rehema starred as Suzanna in Yat Madit in 2016 alongside Gladys Oyenbot and Michael Wawuyo Jr. For this role, she won the award for Best actress TV at the Uganda Film Festival in 2017.

Nanfuka directed the 2018 award-winning film Veronica's Wish for which she won the Best Director Award at the Uganda Film Festival 2018 in Kampala, becoming the first female to win the accolade in Uganda. The film also received eight other awards out of the twelve nominations.

Theatre
On the theatre stage, Rehema's earlier roles were in plays staged at the National Theatre. She starred as Lady Macbeth in the play Macbeth and received critical acclaim for her performance from Daily Monitor critic Brian Magoba and The Observer critic Polly Komukama wrote, "Rehema Nanfuka put up the best performance as the evil Lady Macbeth."

In 2015, she played Dorra and Kate in The Body of a Woman as a Battlefield in the Bosnian War a play by Romanian-French playwright by Matei Visniec and Judith Adong's Ga-Ad! Her other notable theatre credits include The Laramie Project, Tropical Fish (book), Jean Paul Sartre's No Exit, Just me you and the silence and The river and the mountain.

Rehema was one of the voice actors in The Cow Needs a Wife, a play that was streamed on the BBC African Performance programme in 2010.

Rehema's story has been featured on The Moth. And as a spoken word artist Rehema featured in the Goethe Institut's Africa spoken word project. She emerged winner of the Kampala Slam 2013.

Rehema has also received endorsements for commercials for Airtel Uganda, Airtel Malawi, Milkman Uganda, and ECO Bank Uganda.

Rehema plays Lisa Borera in an upcoming film Kafa Coh and Nkinzi in Nana Kagga's upcoming TV series, Reflections.

Education
Rehema went to Kibuli Secondary School, then Makerere University, Uganda's oldest university where she obtained a degree in International Business. She is also an alumna of Maisha Film Lab.

Nominations and awards

Filmography

Film

Television

Theatre

External links
 
 
 https://www.ama-awards.com/amaa-2010-winners.html

References

1986 births
Living people
21st-century Ugandan actresses
Ugandan film producers
Ugandan film directors
Ugandan screenwriters
Ugandan stage actresses
Ugandan film actresses
Ugandan television actresses
People from Kampala
Ugandan women film directors
Ugandan women film producers
Women screenwriters
Makerere University alumni
Maisha Film Lab alumni